Shiko Yamashita (born December 22, 1973) is a Japanese mixed martial artist. He competed in the welterweight and middleweight divisions.

Mixed martial arts record

|-
| Loss
| align=center| 10-5-3
| Takuya Wada
| Submission (Rear-Naked Choke)
| Shooto: Revolutionary Exchanges 3
| 
| align=center| 3
| align=center| 4:26
| Tokyo, Japan
| 
|-
| Loss
| align=center| 10-4-3
| Motoki Miyazawa
| Decision (Unanimous)
| GCM: Cage Force 7
| 
| align=center| 3
| align=center| 5:00
| Tokyo, Japan
| 
|-
| Loss
| align=center| 10-3-3
| Siyar Bahadurzada
| Decision (Unanimous)
| Shooto: Back To Our Roots 4
| 
| align=center| 3
| align=center| 5:00
| Tokyo, Japan
| 
|-
| Win
| align=center| 10-2-3
| Grazhuydas Smailis
| DQ (Grabbing the Ropes)
| Shooto 2006: 9/8 in Korakuen Hall
| 
| align=center| 2
| align=center| 3:21
| Tokyo, Japan
| 
|-
| Win
| align=center| 9-2-3
| Dustin Denes
| Decision (Unanimous)
| AFC 16: Absolute Fighting Championships 16
| 
| align=center| 3
| align=center| 5:00
| Boca Raton, Florida, United States
| 
|-
| Win
| align=center| 8-2-3
| David Bielkheden
| Decision (Majority)
| Shooto: 4/23 in Hakata Star Lanes
| 
| align=center| 3
| align=center| 5:00
| Hakata-ku, Fukuoka, Japan
| 
|-
| Draw
| align=center| 7-2-3
| Martijn de Jong
| Draw
| Shooto: 5/4 in Korakuen Hall
| 
| align=center| 3
| align=center| 5:00
| Tokyo, Japan
| 
|-
| Draw
| align=center| 7-2-2
| Dustin Denes
| Technical Draw
| Shooto: 2/23 in Korakuen Hall
| 
| align=center| 1
| align=center| 3:48
| Tokyo, Japan
| 
|-
| Draw
| align=center| 7-2-1
| Scott Henze
| Draw
| HOOKnSHOOT: Relentless
| 
| align=center| 3
| align=center| 5:00
| Evansville, Indiana, United States
| 
|-
| Win
| align=center| 7-2
| Jun Kitagawa
| Decision (Majority)
| Shooto: Treasure Hunt 5
| 
| align=center| 2
| align=center| 5:00
| Tokyo, Japan
| 
|-
| Loss
| align=center| 6-2
| Curtis Stout
| Decision (Unanimous)
| HOOKnSHOOT: Kings 1
| 
| align=center| 2
| align=center| 5:00
| Evansville, Indiana, United States
| 
|-
| Win
| align=center| 6-1
| Leopoldo Serao
| Decision (Majority)
| Shooto: To The Top 8
| 
| align=center| 3
| align=center| 5:00
| Tokyo, Japan
| 
|-
| Win
| align=center| 5-1
| Ryuta Sakurai
| Decision (Unanimous)
| Shooto: Gig East 3
| 
| align=center| 2
| align=center| 5:00
| Tokyo, Japan
| 
|-
| Win
| align=center| 4-1
| Jeremy Bennett
| Submission (Punches)
| Shooto: Wanna Shooto 2001
| 
| align=center| 2
| align=center| 2:36
| Setagaya, Tokyo, Japan
| 
|-
| Win
| align=center| 3-1
| Matthias Riccio
| Submission (Armbar)
| Shooto: R.E.A.D. 11
| 
| align=center| 1
| align=center| 1:18
| Setagaya, Tokyo, Japan
| 
|-
| Loss
| align=center| 2-1
| Izuru Takeuchi
| Decision (Unanimous)
| Shooto: R.E.A.D. 1
| 
| align=center| 2
| align=center| 5:00
| Tokyo, Japan
| 
|-
| Win
| align=center| 2-0
| Ryota Ibaraki
| Submission (Armbar)
| Shooto: Shooter's Ambition
| 
| align=center| 1
| align=center| 2:15
| Setagaya, Tokyo, Japan
| 
|-
| Win
| align=center| 1-0
| Koichiro Kawaguchi
| TKO (Armbar)
| Daidojuku: WARS 5
| 
| align=center| 3
| align=center| 0:34
| Japan
|

See also
List of male mixed martial artists

References

External links
 

1973 births
Japanese male mixed martial artists
Welterweight mixed martial artists
Middleweight mixed martial artists
Mixed martial artists utilizing judo
Mixed martial artists utilizing Brazilian jiu-jitsu
Japanese male judoka
Japanese practitioners of Brazilian jiu-jitsu
Living people